Ingibjörg Pálmadóttir (born 18 February 1949) is an Icelandic politician and former minister.

External links 
 Non auto-biography of Ingibjörg Pálmadóttir on the parliament website

1949 births
Living people
Ingibjorg Palmadottir
Ingibjorg Palmadottir
Ingibjorg Palmadottir